Ichthyophis larutensis, the Larut Hills caecilian, is a species of amphibian in the family Ichthyophiidae found in Malaysia and Thailand. Its natural habitats are subtropical or tropical moist lowland forests, subtropical or tropical moist montane forests, rivers, intermittent rivers, plantations, rural gardens, heavily degraded former forest, irrigated land, and seasonally flooded agricultural land.

References

larutensis
Amphibians described in 1960
Amphibians of Malaysia
Amphibians of Thailand
Taxonomy articles created by Polbot